College of Health Technology, Ningi is a government owned tertiary institution located in, Ningi, Ningi local government area, Bauchi State, Nigeria.

Courses
The list of courses offered by the College of Health Technology Ningi include the following:

Community Health Extension Work
Environmental Health Technology
Environmental Health Assistance
Health Promotion and Education
Medical Laboratory Technology
Nutrition and Dietetics
Dental Health Technology
Pharmacy
Health Information Management

References

External links

Health sciences schools in Nigeria
Education in Bauchi State
Establishments in Nigeria by year
Universities and colleges by date of establishment
Buildings and structures in Bauchi State